Khot or KHOT may refer to:
 Khot, Armenia, a village in Armenia
 Khot Valley in northern Pakistan
 Union Council Khot, an Administrative subdivision
 KHOT (AM), a radio station (1250 AM) licensed to Madera, California, United States
 KHOT-FM, a radio station (105.9 FM) licensed to Paradise Valley, Arizona, United States
 Memorial Field Airport in Hot Springs, Arkansas, United States

People with the name 
 Jehangir Khot (1913–1990), Indian cricketer
 Sadabhau Khot, Indian politician
 Subhash Khot (born 1978), Indian-American mathematician and theoretical computer scientist